Governor Orr may refer to:

Charles William James Orr (1870–1945), Governor of the Bahamas from 1927 to 1932
James Lawrence Orr (1822–1873), 73rd Governor of South Carolina
Kay A. Orr (born 1939), 36th Governor of Nebraska
Robert D. Orr (1917–2004), 45th Governor of Indiana